Cnephasia is a genus of tortrix moths (family Tortricidae). It belongs to the subfamily Tortricinae and therein to the tribe Cnephasiini, of which it is the type genus.

Taxonomy and systematics
The type species around which Cnephasia was established by J. Curtis in 1826 (in the explanations to plate 100 of his British Entomology) was claimed to be "Tortrix logiana". However, this was a misidentification; the name of T. logiana (described by C.A. Clerck in 1759 and nowadays called Acleris logiana) was until the early 20th century frequently applied to related species in error.

Curtis simply repeated the mistake of A.H. Haworth, who had in his 1811 volume of Lepidoptera Britannica discussed a Cnephasia under Clerck's name, but the original misidentification may well go back to Linnaeus' treatment of "T. logiana" in Systema naturae. Eventually, this was resolved, and the type species of Cnephasia was determined to be the tortrix moth described as Olethreutes pasiuana by J. Hübner in 1822.

Species
The currently recognized species of Cnephasia are:

 Cnephasia abrasana (Duponchel in Godart, 1842)
 Cnephasia albatana Chrétien, 1915
 Cnephasia alfacarana Razowski, 1958
 Cnephasia alticola Kuznetzov, 1966
 Cnephasia alticolana
 Cnephasia amseli (Lucas, 1942)
 Cnephasia asiatica Kuznetzov, 1956
 Cnephasia asseclana – flax tortrix
 Cnephasia bizensis Réal, 1953
 Cnephasia chrysantheana (Duponchel in Godart, 1842)
 Cnephasia communana
 Cnephasia conspersana Douglas, 1846
 Cnephasia constantinana Razowski, 1958
 Cnephasia cupressivorana (Staudinger, 1871)
 Sciaphila debiliana Walker, 1863
 Cnephasia delnoyana Groenen & Schreurs, 2012
 Cnephasia disforma Razowski, 1983
 Cnephasia disparana Kuznetzov in Danilevsky, Kuznetsov & Falkovitsh, 1962
 Cnephasia divisana Razowski, 1959
 Cnephasia ecullyana Réal, 1951
 Cnephasia etnana Razowski & Trematerra, 1999
 Cnephasia facetana Kennel, 1901
 Cnephasia fiorii Razowski, 1958
 Cnephasia fragosana (Zeller, 1847)
 Cnephasia fulturata Rebel, 1940
 Cnephasia genitalana Pierce & Metcalfe, 1915
 Cnephasia graecana Rebel, 1902
 Cnephasia grandis (Osthelder, 1938)
 Cnephasia gueneeana (Duponchel in Godart, 1836)
 Cnephasia heinemanni Obraztsov, 1957
 Cnephasia hellenica Obraztsov, 1956
 Cnephasia heringi Razowski, 1958
 Cnephasia hunzorum Diakonoff, 1971
 Cnephasia incertana – light grey tortrix
 Cnephasia jozefi Razowski, 1961
 Cnephasia kasyi Razowski, 1971
 Cnephasia kenneli Obraztsov, 1956

 Cnephasia klimeschi Razowski, 1958
 Cnephasia korvaci Razowski, 1965
 Cnephasia laetana (Staudinger, 1871)
 Cnephasia lineata (Walsingham, 1900)
 Cnephasia longana (Haworth, [1811])
 Cnephasia margelanensis Razowski, 1958
 Cnephasia microstrigana Razowski, 1958
 Cnephasia minutula Falkovitsh in Danilevsky, Kuznetsov & Falkovitsh, 1962
 Cnephasia nesiotica Razowski, 1983
 Cnephasia nigripunctana Amsel, 1959
 Cnephasia nigrofasciana (Bruand, 1850)
 Cnephasia nowickii Razowski, 1958
 Cnephasia orientana (Alphéraky, 1877)
 Cnephasia orthias Meyrick, 1910
 Cnephasia oxyacanthana (Herrich-Schäffer, 1851)
 Cnephasia parnassicola Razowski, 1958
 Cnephasia pasiuana (Hübner, 1799)
 Cnephasia personatana Kennel, 1901
 Cnephasia razowskii Alipanah, 2019
 Cnephasia regifica Razowski, 1971
 Cnephasia sedana (Constant, 1884)
 Cnephasia semibrunneata (de Joannis, 1891)
 Cnephasia stachi Razowski, 1958
 Cnephasia stephensiana – grey tortrix
 Cnephasia tianshanica Filipjev, 1934
 Cnephasia tofina Meyrick, 1922
 Cnephasia tremewani Razowski, 1961
 Cnephasia tripolitana Razowski, 1958
 Cnephasia tristrami (Walsingham, 1900)
 Cnephasia ussurica Filipjev, 1962
 Cnephasia venusta Razowski, 1971
 Cnephasia virginana (Kennel, 1899)
 Cnephasia wimmeri Arenberger, 1998
 Cnephasia zangheriana Trematerra, 1991
 Cnephasia zelleri (Christoph, 1877)
 Cnephasia zernyi Razowski, 1959

"Cnephasia" jactatana does not seem to belong in this genus.

Former species
 Cnephasia daedalea Razowski, 1983

Synonyms
Obsolete scientific names for Cnephasia are:
 Anoplocnephasia Réal, 1953
 Brachycnephasia Réal, 1953
 Chephasia (lapsus)
 Cnephasianella (lapsus)
 Cnephasiella Adamczewski, 1936
 Cnephosia (lapsus)
 Hypostephanuncia Réal, 1951
 Hypostephanuntia (lapsus)
 Sciaphila Treitschke in Ochsenheimer, 1829

Hypostephanuncia is sometimes listed as a junior synonym of the closely related genus Eana, but its type species is C. ecullyana. Whether the monotypic Sphaleroptera is a distinct and valid genus or merely a specialized offshoot of Cnephasia is not yet resolved; some authors include it here, while others don't.

Footnotes

References

  (2019): An overview of the tribe Cnephasiini (Lepidoptera: Tortricidae: Tortricinae) of Iran with description of a new species. Zootaxa 4661(3): 501-521.
  (2009a): Online World Catalogue of the Tortricidae – Genus Cnephasia account. Version 1.3.1. Retrieved 2009-JAN-20.
  (2009b): Online World Catalogue of the Tortricidae – Cnephasia species list. Version 1.3.1. Retrieved 2009-JAN-20.
  [1826]: [Genus Cnephasia]. In: British Entomology, being illustrations and descriptions of the genera of insects found in Great Britain and Ireland, etc. 6(100): 1-2. E. Ellis & Co., London. Fulltext at the Internet Archive
  (1998): The genera of Tortricidae. Part III. Nearctic Chlidanotinae and Tortricidae. Acta Zoologica Cracoviensia 41(2): 227-281. Fulltext at Google Books
  (2005a): Markku Savela's Lepidoptera and some other life forms – Cnephasia. Version of 2005-SEP-14. Retrieved 2010-APR-14.
  (2005b): Markku Savela's Lepidoptera and some other life forms – Eana. Version of 2005-SEP-14. Retrieved 2010-APR-14.
  (2010): Markku Savela's Lepidoptera and some other life forms – Acleris logiana. Version of 2010-FEB-19. Retrieved 2010-APR-14.

 
Cnephasiini
Tortricidae genera